Oyen or Øyen may refer to:

People
 Arild Retvedt Øyen (born 1946), Norwegian veterinarian and diplomat
 Else Øyen, Norwegian sociologist
 Knud Iversen Øyen (1865–1942), Norwegian jurist and politician
 Kristen Øyen (born 1938), Norwegian forester
 Jarmund Øyen (born 1944), Norwegian politician
 Odd Øyen (1914–1997), Norwegian WW2 resistance member
 Ørjar Øyen (born 1927), Norwegian sociologist
 Sofie Oyen (born 1992), Belgian tennis player
 Tera de Marez Oyens (1932–1996), Dutch composer

Places
 Oyen, town in Alberta, Canada
 Saint-Oyen (disambiguation)
 Saint-Oyen, Savoie, in France
 Saint-Oyen, Aosta Valley, in Italy
 Saint-Oyens, in Switzerland